Széll Kálmán tér (Széll Kálmán Square) is a station on the M2 (East-West) line of the Budapest Metro. It is located under Széll Kálmán Square in Buda. At 38.4m below ground level, it is the deepest station of the Budapest Metro. Near the station, numerous bus and tram routes pass or converge, making it one of the city's major transport interchanges. The station was open on 22 December 1972 as part of the extension of the line from Deák Ferenc tér to Déli pályaudvar.

From its opening in 1972 until 2011, the station (and square) was known as Moszkva tér. The exterior of the building is strikingly similar to that of Saint Petersburg's Pionerskaya Station. Renovations of the station began in 2015, along with the surrounding square.

Connections
 Tram
4 Széll Kálmán tér – Újbuda-központ
6 Széll Kálmán tér – Móricz Zsigmond körtér
17 Bécsi út / Vörösvári út – Savoya Park
56 Hűvösvölgy – Városház tér
56A Hűvösvölgy – Móricz Zsigmond körtér
59 Szent János Kórház – Márton Áron tér
59A Széll Kálmán tér – Márton Áron tér
59B Hűvösvölgy – Márton Áron tér
61 Hűvösvölgy – Móricz Zsigmond körtér
 Bus: 5, 16, 16A, 21, 21A, 22, 22A, 39, 91, 102, 116, 128, 129, 139, 140, 140A, 149, 155, 156, 221, 222
 : 781, 782, 783, 784, 785, 786, 787, 789, 791, 793, 794, 795

Gallery

References

External links

M2 (Budapest Metro) stations
Railway stations opened in 1973
1973 establishments in Hungary